Amnesicoma is a genus of moths in the family Geometridae.

Species
 Amnesicoma albiseriata Warren, 1893
 Amnesicoma simplex Warren, 1895

References
 Amnesicoma at Natural History Museum genus database
 Amnesicoma at Markku Savela's Lepidoptera and some other life forms

Larentiinae
Geometridae genera